A mesoregion is a medium-sized region between the size of a city or district and that of a nation. Examples of conceptual mesoregions in Southeast Europe include Epirus, Istria, and Kosovo etc. An example of the official usage of the term is Mesoregion (Brazil), a grouping of municipalities for statistical purposes.

See also
 Macroregion
 Microdistrict, Soviet and Central European urban housing schemes
 Microregion

References

Geographic taxonomies
Regions